Racing Lady is a 1937 American drama film produced by RKO Radio Pictures, which premiered in New York City on January 12, 1937, and was released nationally on January 29. Directed by Wallace Fox, the screenplay was written by Dorothy Yost, Thomas Lennon, and Cortland Fitzsimmons, based on a story by Damon Runyon, which had been further expanded by J. Robert Bren and Norman Houston.

While more than 25 of Runyon's stories and novels have been used as the basis for films, this was one of only two films (the other being George White's 1935 Scandals) in which Runyon was directly involved with the story, it being based on his unpublished work "All Scarlet." The film stars Ann Dvorak, Smith Ballew, and Harry Carey.

Plot
Longtime thoroughbred breeder and trainer Tom Martin has a mare, Pepper Mary, he's about to enter in a big race. After the owner of another contender fails to bribe Tom to lose on purpose, his jockey causes Pepper Mary to stumble and fall during the race, causing a career-ending injury to the horse.

Tom's disappointed daughter Ruth concentrates all her efforts on Pepper Mary's filly, Katydid, hoping she, too, can become an outstanding racehorse. Steve Wendel, an automobile mogul who has a stable of horses, buys the victorious horse after Ruth enters her in a Santa Anita claiming race.

To stay with her horse, Ruth reluctantly accepts Steve's offer to come work for him. They travel the racing circuit abroad, where Ruth matures from a tomboy into a sophisticated young woman. She falls in love with Steve, and after a misunderstanding over the disappearance of Katydid before a race, they celebrate as their horse races to another triumph.

Cast
 Ann Dvorak as Ruth Martin
 Smith Ballew as Steve Wendel
 Harry Carey as Tom Martin
 Hattie McDaniel as Abby

References

External links

1937 romantic drama films
American romantic drama films
American black-and-white films
Films based on short fiction
Films directed by Wallace Fox
American horse racing films
RKO Pictures films
Films with screenplays by Dorothy Yost
Films produced by Samuel J. Briskin
1937 films
1930s American films